Nerosubianco, styled as nEROSubianco and also released with the international title Attraction, is an Italian black comedy (part collage film) directed by Tinto Brass. The film deals with a variety of contemporary themes such as sexual freedom, racial tensions, and political radicalism from the perspective of a young upper-class Italian woman. The film has also been titled rather exploitatively like The Artful Penetration of Barbara and as Black on White, a literal translation of the Italian title.

Nerosubianco shooting began in October 1967 and it was premiered at the 1968 Cannes Film Festival. The film saw theatrical release in February 1969.

Plot
Barbara (Anita Sanders) has accompanied her husband Paolo (Nino Segurini) to London. He leaves her at Hyde Park for his business transactions and Barbara starts sightseeing, soon to realise that an African American man (Terry Carter) is luring her. She sees it as an opportunity for an adventurous outreach to a new world and as her observations intermingle with her fantasies, she begins to question her own life.

Cast
Anita Sanders: Barbara
Terry Carter: the man
Nino Segurini: Paolo
Umberto Di Grazia: psychic/himself
Tinto Brass: gynecologist (cameo)
Freedom: chorus

References

External links

1968 films
1960s Italian-language films
English-language Italian films
Collage film
Italian black comedy films
Films about race and ethnicity
Adultery in films
Films set in London
Films directed by Tinto Brass
1960s black comedy films
1968 comedy films
1968 drama films
1960s Italian films